The Gladwyne Historic District is a national historic district which is located in Gladwyne in Lower Merion Township, Montgomery County, Pennsylvania.

It was added to the National Register of Historic Places in 1980.

History and architectural features
This district encompasses fifty-seven contributing buildings, which were erected in the historic core of Gladwyne, known as "Merion Square." It includes mainly mill or farm worker dwellings that are predominantly two-and-one-half-story, two-bay, stuccoed stone structures, which date to the early- to mid-nineteenth century. 

Notable buildings include the Guard House Inn, the "War Office," which was built in 1798, and the Gladwyne Library.

This district was added to the National Register of Historic Places in 1980.

References

Historic districts on the National Register of Historic Places in Pennsylvania
Historic districts in Montgomery County, Pennsylvania
National Register of Historic Places in Montgomery County, Pennsylvania